Beinn Eunaich (989 m) is a mountain in the Grampian Mountains of Scotland, located north of the village of Dalmally in Argyll and Bute.

The mountain rises steeply out of Glen Strae and is usually climbed in conjunction with its neighbour Beinn a' Chochuill.

References

Mountains and hills of Argyll and Bute
Marilyns of Scotland
Munros